A Farmer's Life is a 1965 Danish comedy film directed by Erik Balling and starring Lone Hertz, Morten Grunwald and Ellen Winther Lembourn. It is based on the classic German novel From My Farming Days by Fritz Reuter, and Fleming Lynge's operetta inspired by the novel.

The film's sets were designed by the art director Henning Bahs.

Cast
 Lone Hertz as Marie Møller
 Morten Grunwald as Frits Triddlefitz
 Ellen Winther Lembourn as Louise Havermann
 Pouel Kern as Karl Havermann
 Frits Helmuth as Grev Frantz
 Holger Juul Hansen as Grev Axel von Rambow
 Helle Virkner as Grevinde Frida von Rambow
 Helge Kjærulff-Schmidt as Zakarias Bræsig
 Poul Reichhardt as 'Fukse' Frederiksen
 Hans Kurt as Markus 'Mukke' Mackenfeldt
 Kirsten Walther as Elvira Victoria Cornelia 'Hønse' Hansen
 Ernst Meyer as Jokum
 Lise Thomsen as Kvinde der danser med Frederiksen
 Kirsten Søberg as Kokkepigen
 Henny Lindorff Buckhøj as Gæst på godset

References

Bibliography
 John Sundholm. Historical Dictionary of Scandinavian Cinema. Scarecrow Press, 2012.

External links

1965 films
1960s Danish-language films
1965 comedy films
Films directed by Erik Balling
Films with screenplays by Erik Balling
ASA Filmudlejning films
Nordisk Film films
Danish comedy films
Films based on German novels